The Legend of Neil is a comedy web series distributed by Comedy Central's partner Atom.com and is a parody of the Nintendo game The Legend of Zelda. Sandeep Parikh of The Guild fame directs the series. Tony Janning writes for the series, and acts as the title character Neil. Felicia Day and Mike Rose, who have worked with Parikh on the set of The Guild, appear as recurring characters.

The series follows Neil, who is sucked into the world of The Legend of Zelda while playing the game. As he travels Hyrule he is mistaken for the hero of the game, Link. The series is "full of self degrading, foul humor", such as when Neil is being sucked into the game he is masturbating and strangled himself with his NES controller.

The series began as a four-minute YouTube video posted in 2007. The video went viral, receiving several million views. Its popularity led to Atom.com financing a web series based around the video.

The first season was released in 2008. According to Fox Business before the premiere of the second season, "With nearly one million plays, the hit Web series by creator Sandeep Parikh built one of the Web's most enthusiastic fan bases in 2008." In the run-up to the August 2009 premiere of the second season, MTV2 planned to air the complete first season. The series was also nominated for multiple Streamys at the 1st Streamy Awards in 2009.

Season 3 began on July 25, 2010. Each episode of season 3 features a remix of the original theme song performed by a different musical guest.

A DVD was released on December 4, 2012.

On January 7, 2019, The YouTube channel EffinFunny began re-releasing the Episodes, starting with the first two. As of January 31, 2019, the whole series, gag reels, and minisodes are available on the EffinFunny YouTube channel.

Characters and cast
Neil (Link) – after getting fired from a gas station by his brother, a drunken Neil was transported into the Nintendo game The Legend of Zelda. He then unwillingly plays the role of the game's main character, a forest elf named Link. Neil as Link contrasts with many of the characters' views of Link, while Link is honest and brave, Neil is lazy and will use any tricks he can find to get out of the game. He is so much the opposite of Link that he tends to befriend the monsters whose sole purpose is to kill him. Neil is portrayed by co-writer of the series, Tony Janning.
Old Man – Link's in-game mentor, loosely based on the old man in the first Zelda video game who gives the player a wooden sword before the first level. Old Man is portrayed by Mike Rose. Old Man has a twin brother O-old Man (pronounced with a change in emphasis) who is left-handed, a better potion maker, and has Tourette syndrome. Usually only one of the twins speaks to Link, but on occasion—such as in Season 2, Episode 3—they appear simultaneously. Both of the Old Men are generally helpful to Neil, often in a sarcastic or condescending manner.
Fairy – a fairy who replenishes Link's health. In the series she does so by having sex with Link, and she becomes emotionally and sexually obsessed with him. Fairy also seems to be emotionally unstable, often taking Neil's compliments as insults and vice versa. In the series, the fairies are hunted for their dust, which is used as a drug, a fate which befalls Fairy in Season 2, Episode 1. In the first episode of the third season it is revealed that the fairy is pregnant. Fairy is portrayed by Felicia Day of Dr. Horrible and The Guild fame.
Princess Zelda – the title character from the video game. Zelda's parents were killed by Ganon and she herself was captured and imprisoned. She appears to Neil in visions, alternately pleading and enticing him to continue to rescue her. Neil was initially surprised by her ethnic appearance, expecting a lighter-skinned princess from the video game graphics (In "The Legend of Neil" she's black). Zelda is portrayed by Angie Hill. Dr. Horrible co-creator Maurissa Tancharoen Whedon provides Zelda's singing voice in the musical episode.
Ganon – the leading antagonist of the game and series. Ganon is played as an incompetent authority figure, impervious to the suggestions of his advisor Wizzrobe. Ganon never seems to leave his shadowed throne until the end of season two. He seems to enjoy singing and is a patron of stand-up comedy. Ganon's ineptitude extends to his attempts to woo Princess Zelda at a "romantic" dinner. In the Season 2 finale he reveals to Zelda that his parents are trapped in some "vortex". It is implied that Ganon is a Moblin. When his face is finally shown, there are similarities, and he comments that he possesses three penises, a trait previously attributed to the Moblins. Ganon is portrayed by Scott Chernoff.
Wizzrobe – Ganon's sidekick. He first appears after Neil has met Fairy and steals Neil's clothing to lure him to the Level 1 dungeon. He frequently observes logical inconsistencies within the game that are recognizable to fans, such as the maps and keys that are left in the dungeon for Link to find. Whenever he suggests changing the policy to Ganon, he is abused for his presumption, forcing him into the role of a fawning toady. Wizzrobe applies Ganon's makeup before his 'big date' with the captive Princess Zelda, prompting Ganon to insinuate that Wizzrobe is infatuated with him, prompting unconvincing denial. Wizzrobe is actually gay and is seen in the finale smooching with the Male Fairy. Wizzrobe is portrayed by Eric Acosta.
Dark Nut – A powerful dark knight (nonsensically renamed by Ganon to conform to The Legend of Zelda terminology) introduced by Wizzrobe as an invincible opponent to Neil. The other Dark Nuts are seemingly unfazed by Neil's sword blasts, and the Dark Nut was able to knock him unconscious with a single blow. But in the second episode of the third season it is revealed that, due to budget cuts, the Dark Nuts' armor doesn't cover their butts. This is their only weakness and eventually they are killed by Neil. Darknut has a brother who appears in "The Gloffice" and is seen crying over his dead brothers as Wizzrobe comforts him. In the finale, this Dark Nut is (like Wizzrobe) gay and is seen making out with a Stalfos. Dark Nut is portrayed by Jeff Winkler.
Octorok – In Season 1, Neil is often plagued by the Octorok creatures. In the show they are depicted as thin men wearing loin cloths and red masks. They announce their presence with an odd ululation, and throw rocks at Neil. They occasionally speak to Neil, usually to threaten him in their scary voice, try to trick him in their squeaky voice, or to plead in their normal voice when one of them is killed by Neil, but generally stick to the ululation. In Season 2 "A Link to the Past" he kills three of them. In "Gettin' High in Hyrule", one of them is used as a dartboard and feels no pain. And in "The Gloffice", one of them works there.
Moblin – Moblins are strong creatures with three penises who seem to want nothing but to destroy and sodomize Link. The most notable Moblins are Blight of Ganon's "The Gloffice" and the secret moblin, Pippi who helps Link even against his "primal" urges. Moblins are depicted as humanoid because of the low budget of the series. The Moblins (except Pippi) attack Neil but with some help from the bow, sex with Fairy and sword beams, he kills them all.
Stalfos – Three Stalfos made only two appearances—in "The Skeletons in Link's Closet" and "Restart of the King". They are portrayed as gay skeletons with German accents that mock Neil into killing them. They tease Neil by insulting him and making up some stupid deals causing him to stab two of them and laser the last one. The first one has a key in its ribs and a bandana, the second one has a belt, and the third one has a mustache. One of them is seen in the finale, making out with a Dark Nut.
Keese – Keeses appear in "The Skeletons in Link's Closet", "A Date with Destiny" and "The Gloffice". They look like models on strings because of the low budget of the series. After Neil puts on the Hero's Clothes, a bat takes a dump on him and they attack him by swarming around him like bees. After Neil escapes and kills the Stalfos, the Keeses attack him again. In Season 1 "Map Questing", the Keeses are revealed by Wizzrobe telling Ganon that Neil has killed all the Keeses. Neil kills them in Season 2 in "A Date with Destiny" and one Keese appears in "The Gloffice" talking to Ganon in the introduction.
Goriya – Three Goriyas make their one appearance in Season 1 in "Map Questing". They are portrayed as goblins with Australian accents, carrying boomerangs. They say to Neil that they're powerful and they've got boomerangs. Neil zaps the three Goriyas with his sword beams. One Goriya appears in a picture in Season 2 "Gettin' High in Hyrule" that says, "Missing. Last seen playing with boomerangs."
Gibdo – Gibdos appear in three episodes: "Les Neilérables", in which Neil sings after killing them; "A Date with Destiny", in which Neil kills them while they make out and give birth to a baby Gibdo, which Neil kicks away; and "The Gloffice", in which one of them works there.

Plot

Season 1 (2007, 2008)

Season 2 (2009)

Season 3 (2010)

Regular episodes

Minisodes

External links
 
 The Legend of Neil on Effinfunny.com.

References

2008 web series debuts
2010 web series endings
American comedy web series
Works about video games
Fantasy web series